The 2010 Memphis Tigers football team represented the University of Memphis in the 2010 NCAA Division I FBS college football season. The Tigers were led by head coach Larry Porter, who was in his first season. The Tigers played their home games at Liberty Bowl Memorial Stadium and are members of Conference USA in its East Division. They finished the season 1–11, 0–8 in C-USA play.

Schedule

References

Memphis
Memphis Tigers football seasons
Memphis Tigers football